John Williams was a Welsh-born goldsmith based in London who worked for the royal family.

He was a son of William Coetmor, and is associated with the property Hafod Lwyfog in Nant Gwynant near Beddgelert. In 1610 he donated a silver chalice and paten-cover to the church in Beddgelert.

He was an apprentice of the London goldsmith and Mayor Richard Martin in 1584. Martin supplied silver plate to Queen Elizabeth. By November 1598, he was working at the Sign of the Cross Keys in Cheapside.

Williams worked for James VI and I and Prince Henry. He provided silver gilt plate, cups and dishes, gold chains, and medallions with the king's portrait, many of which were given to ambassadors visiting London. Recipients of plate and medals bought from Williams between 1603 and 1606 include the Venetian diplomats Nicolò Molin and Scaramelli, and to diplomats including Andrew Sinclair, Christian Barnekow, Steen Brahe, Peder Munk, and Henrik Ramel. Anne of Denmark gave John Florio a cup of his making at his grandchild's christening.

Williams supplied the gilt plate given by King James to Adam Newton, the tutor of Prince Henry in June 1605 when he married Katherine Puckering.

Williams provided Anne of Denmark with a "fountain of silver gilt, well chased, containing one basin with two tops, one of them being three satyres or wild men, the other a woman with a sail or flag". The fountain had three taps or cocks decorated with mermaids. It was used at Somerset House. The wild men were heraldic supporters of the Danish royal arms.

Michael Drayton mentioned his friend John Williams in a preface to Poly-Olbion (London, 1612), addressed "to my Friends the Cambro-Britans".

In 1614 he made gilt plate given to Elizabeth Stuart, Queen of Bohemia at the baptism of her son Henry Frederick. He also made plate given to Jean Drummond on her marriage to Lord Roxburghe, to John Murray of the bedchamber, and Audrey Walsingham.

He loaned £5000 to King James in 1621 on the security of ten jewels from the royal collection.

A son, also John Williams (d. 1637) was a London goldsmith.

References

External links
 Warrant to pay John Williams, 23 July 1604, Folger Shakespeare Library
 Warrant from King James to pay John Williams, 31 December 1604, Folger Shakespeare Library

17th-century Welsh businesspeople
Welsh goldsmiths
Material culture of royal courts